Syro-Malankara Catholic Eparchy of Muvattupuzha is an eparchy of the Syro-Malankara Catholic Church in Muvattupuzha, Kerala, India. The seat of the eparchy is at St. Joseph's Syro-Malankara Catholic Cathedral in Muvattupuzha. It is a suffragan of the Syro-Malankara Catholic Archeparchy of Tiruvalla.

History
The eparchy of Muvattupuzha was erected in 2003 bifurcating the Archeparchy of Tiruvalla.

References

Syro-Malankara Catholic dioceses
Dioceses in Kerala
Dioceses established in the 21st century
Christian organizations established in 2003
2003 establishments in Kerala
Muvattupuzha
Churches in Ernakulam district